René Groth (born 9 June 1972) is a German former footballer who played for Dynamo Dresden, FSV Zwickau and VfB Leipzig.

References

External links

1972 births
Living people
German footballers
Footballers from Dresden
Association football defenders
Association football midfielders
Dynamo Dresden players
Dynamo Dresden II players
FSV Zwickau players
1. FC Lokomotive Leipzig players
Bundesliga players
2. Bundesliga players